The 41st Daytime Emmy Awards, presented by the National Academy of Television Arts and Sciences (NATAS), "recognizes outstanding achievement in all fields of daytime television production and are presented to individuals and programs broadcast from 2:00 a.m. to 6:00 p.m. during the 2013 calendar year". The ceremony took place on June 22, 2014  at The Beverly Hilton,  in Beverly Hills, California beginning at 5:00 p.m. PST / 8:00 p.m. EST.  

For the first time in the event's four-decade history, the Daytime Emmy ceremony will forgo a traditional TV broadcast and instead air only online through the DaytimeEmmys.net website.  In prior years, broadcast rights to the event were shared on a rotating basis by ABC, CBS, and NBC, with exceptions in 2009 (The CW), 2012, and 2013 (cable's HLN both years). The ceremony was also executive produced by Spike Jones Jr. and SJ2 Entertainment with Terry D. Peterson.

The evening was hosted by comedian Kathy Griffin for the first time. The drama pre-nominees were announced on March 3, 2014 and the standards nominations were announced on May 1, 2014. 

In October 2013, the Academy announced the addition of two new categories, “Outstanding Entertainment News” which will honor the entertainment industry with a focus on human interest, popular culture and celebrity gossip and interviews. The second new category, “Outstanding New Approaches Drama Series” will honor any daytime drama series which has less than 35 original episodes in the 2013 calendar year. In related events,  the 40th Annual Creative Arts Emmy Awards ceremony was held at the Westin Bonaventure in Los Angeles on June 20, 2014.

The Young and the Restless won the most awards, with five trophies including for Outstanding Drama Series. The series also had received the most nominations, with a total of 26 (including Creative Arts Emmy Awards). Although, being defunct and revived online One Life to Live  won in the Outstanding Drama Series Directing Team category. 

While, Days of Our Lives earned three wins out of the six acting categories including the third consecutive win of Chandler Massey in the Outstanding Younger Actor in a Drama Series category. Massey made history with his win as he is the second actor to win the category three times – following Jonathan Jackson, who won for General Hospital in 1995, 1998, and 1999 – and the first to do so in consecutive years.  Steve Harvey won Outstanding Game Show Host for Family Feud while his talk show series,  Steve Harvey  won Outstanding Talk Show/Informative.

Winners and nominees

In the lists below, the winner of the category is shown first, with a double-dagger, followed by the other nominees.

References

041
Emmy Awards